All Saints' Church, Beckingham is a Grade II* listed parish church in the Church of England in Beckingham, Nottinghamshire, England.

History
The church dates from the 13th century.  It was restored by Ewan Christian in 1892.

It is part of a joint parish with:
All Saints' Church, Misterton
St Mary Magdalene's Church, Walkeringham
St Mary the Virgin's Church, West Stockwith

Organ
The organ dates from 1847. A specification of the organ can be found on the National Pipe Organ Register.

See also
Grade II* listed buildings in Nottinghamshire
Listed buildings in Beckingham, Nottinghamshire

References

Church of England church buildings in Nottinghamshire
Grade II* listed churches in Nottinghamshire